The Baigong pipes, which are also known as  (Bai Gongshan Iron Pipes) and Delingha pipes, are a series of pipe-like features identified as fossil trees or tree roots, found on and near White Mountain ( 'Mount Baigong'), about  southwest of the city of Delingha, in the Haixi Mongol and Tibetan Autonomous Prefecture, Qinghai Province, China.

White Mountain (白公山)
Some of the Baigong pipes are reported to be associated with three caves in White Mountain. These caves are reported to occur within the front face of White Mountain. The mouths of the two smaller caves have collapsed. Only the largest cave, which is 6 meters (18 feet) high, can be entered. The vague resemblance of the top of White Mountain to a pyramid has been the focus of speculation.

Two pipe-like structures have been reported from the largest cave. One of these is described as being 40 cm (16 in) in diameter, one only preserved as a reddish-brown half-pipe formation. Dozens of upright pipe-like features, about 10 to 40 cm (4 to 16 inches) in diameter, were also found protruding from White Mountain above the largest cave.

Tuosu Lake (Lake Toson)
Similar formations were found on shore and within Tuosu Lake, also transliterated as Lake Toson, which lies 80 meters (260 feet) from the mouth of the largest cave. On the beach of the lake, about 40 meters (130 feet) from the mouth of the largest cave, apparently flat-lying, hollow, pipe-like features were found, reddish-brown, and ranging in diameter from 2 to 4.5 cm (0.8 to 1.8 inch) and have an east–west orientation. Another group of similar features, presumably vertical, either protrude from or lie just below the surface of the lake, but the reports are unclear. Tuosu Lake is a saline and alkaline lake with a dominant bacterial population made of Halomonas.

Investigation
Associated with these pipe-like features are objects that were described as "rusty scraps" and "strangely shaped stones". Analysis of the former by Liu Shaolin at a local smeltery reportedly found that they consist of 30 percent ferric oxide (oxidized iron) and large amounts of silicon dioxide and calcium oxide.  Because any metallurgical analysis reports the composition of a material analyzed not in terms of the actual minerals comprising it, but only in terms of percentages of the oxides of the specific elements present, the calcium present in the analyzed material could have been in the form of calcite, a mineral that naturally forms concretions.

According to news stories, the pipes were first discovered by a group of scientists from the United States who were seeking dinosaur fossils. The scientists are said to have reported the formations to local authorities in Delingha. However, the pipes did not attract attention until a later report, possibly one of six made by Ye Zhou, appeared in the Henan Dahe Bao ( 'Henan Great River News') in June 2002. Quin Jianwen, a local official, discussed the pipe-like features with journalists of the Xinhua News Agency on June 16, 2002. The local government now promotes the features as a tourist attraction, to which road signs and tourist guides lead visitors.

According to a 2003 article in the Xinmin Weekly, Chinese scientists using atomic emission spectroscopy found the Baigong Pipes to contain organic matter of plant origin. In addition, the news article also stated that tree rings were found in sections of these rock formations and, as a result, they were judged to be fossil trees or tree roots.

The state-run newspaper People's Daily reported on a 2007 investigation in which a research fellow from the Chinese Earthquake Administration reported they had found some of the pipes to be highly radioactive.

References

Sources
 

Landforms of Qinghai
Tourist attractions in Qinghai
Pseudoarchaeology
Haixi Mongol and Tibetan Autonomous Prefecture

it:Archeologia misteriosa#Tubi di Baigong